The Santana 23 is an American trailerable sailboat that was designed by W. Shad Turner as a racer-cruiser and first built in 1978. It was produced in two versions with different keels and rigs.

Production
The design was built by W. D. Schock Corp in the United States, starting in 1978, but it is now out of production.

Design
The Santana 23 is a recreational keelboat, built predominantly of fiberglass. It has a raked stem plumb stem, a semi-cut-down reverse transom.

The boat is normally fitted with a small  outboard motor for docking and maneuvering.

The design has sleeping accommodation for four people, with a double "V"-berth in the bow cabin and two straight settee berths in the main cabin. The galley is located on both sides just aft of the bow cabin. The galley is equipped with a sink.

Variants
Santana 23 D
This "drop keel" model was introduced in 1978 and built until 1984, with 144 boats completed. It has a fractional sloop rig; a transom-hung, lifting rudder controlled by a tiller and lifting keel. It displaces  and carries  of ballast,  of which is the keel weight.
Santana 23 K
This "fixed keel" model was produced from 1984-1987, with 50 boats built. It has a masthead sloop rig, an internally mounted spade-type rudder controlled by a tiller and a fixed fin keel. It displaces  and carries  of ballast.

Operational history
In a 2010 review Steve Henkel wrote, "best features: A comparison of statistics with her comp[etitor], the San Juan 23, shows that the Santana 23 (either the K or D version), despite similar ballast and displacement figures, is (like the Wavelength 24) more of a serious racing boat. The Santana's PHRF, for example, is 63 seconds-per-mile faster than the San Juan 23. She also has the highest Space Index. Worst features: The hull is built light (weight excluding ballast is under 1,500 pounds), so you need to be careful to avoid damage."

See also
List of sailing boat types

References

External links
Photo of a Santana 23 D with rudder up

Keelboats
1970s sailboat type designs
Sailing yachts
Trailer sailers
Sailboat type designs by W. Shad Turner
Sailboat types built by W. D. Schock Corp